"Good Morning Heartache"  is a song written by Irene Higginbotham, Ervin Drake, and Dan Fisher. It was recorded by jazz singer Billie Holiday on January 22, 1946.

Bill Stegmeyer and his Orchestra (Decca Session No. 54) New York City, January 22, 1946: with Chris Griffin (trumpet), Joe Guy (trumpet), Bill Stegmeyer (alto saxophone), Hank Ross (tenor saxophone), Bernie Kaufman (tenor saxophone), Armand Camgros (tenor saxophone), Joe Springer (piano), Tiny Grimes (guitar), John Simmons (bass), Sidney Catlett (drums), Billie Holiday (vocal) + 4 strings.

The song has subsequently been recorded by numerous artists.

Chart recordings
The song was recorded by singer Diana Ross, when she portrayed Holiday in the movie Lady Sings the Blues, in 1972. Ross brought jazz back to the pop and R&B audiences, sending it to numbers 20 and 34 on the US Billboard R&B and Pop charts respectively.

References

Billie Holiday songs
Diana Ross songs
1972 singles
1946 songs
1940s jazz standards
Songs written by Ervin Drake
Decca Records singles
Motown singles
Jill Scott (singer) songs